Badoc Island is a private island in Brgy. 5-A Pagsanahan Sur (formerly San Arisada-ad), Badoc, Ilocos Norte. 

Located about 1 kilometre from the mainland, the island has a long stretch of beach with white sand, natural rock and cliff formations on the south, and a natural platform on the north. The whole island measures around 36.256 hectares. 

The island was opened for investors by the provincial government of Ilocos Norte government in February 2021.

See also
 List of islands of the Philippines
 List of islands
 Desert island

References

Islands of Ilocos Norte
Uninhabited islands of the Philippines